David Campbell Milne (born 29 January 1939) is a Zimbabwean archer. He competed in the men's individual event at the 1980 Summer Olympics.

References

External links
 

1939 births
Living people
Zimbabwean male archers
Olympic archers of Zimbabwe
Archers at the 1980 Summer Olympics
Place of birth missing (living people)